Vairocana (also Mahāvairocana) is a cosmic buddha from Mahayana and Vajrayana Buddhism. Vairocana is often interpreted, in texts like the Avatamsaka Sutra, as the dharmakāya of the historical Gautama Buddha. In East Asian Buddhism (Chinese, Korean, Japanese and Vietnamese Buddhism), Vairocana is also seen as the embodiment of the Buddhist concept of śūnyatā. In the conception of the 5 Jinas of Mahayana and Vajrayana Buddhism, Vairocana is at the centre and is considered a Primordial Buddha.

Vairocana is not to be confused with Vairocana Mahabali, son of Virochana. Vairocana Mahabali attained to sahaja nirvikalpa samadhi in Yoga Vasishta.

Literary and historical development
Vairocana Buddha is first introduced in the Brahmajala Sutra:

Vairocana is also mentioned in the Avatamsaka Sutra; however, the doctrine of Vairocana is based largely on the teachings of the Mahavairocana Tantra (also known as the ) and to a lesser degree the Vajrasekhara Sutra (also known as the  Tantra).

In the Avatamsaka Sutra, Vairocana is described as having attained enlightenment immeasurable ages ago and residing in a world purified by him while he was a bodhisattva. He also presides over an assembly of countless other bodhisattvas. He may be considered the celestial existence (saṃbhogakāya) of Gautama Buddha, who came to be as Vairochana's earthly rebirth from his previous existence in Tushita heaven. Similarly, the Brahmajala Sutra also states that Shakyamuni was originally named Vairochana, regarding the former as a physical incarnation (nirmāṇakāya) of the latter.

Vairocana is also mentioned as an epithet of Gautama Buddha in the Samantabhadra Meditation Sutra, who dwells in a place called "Always Tranquil Light". In the Śūraṅgama mantra (Chinese: 楞嚴咒; pinyin: Léngyán Zhòu) taught in the Śūraṅgama sutra (Chinese: 楞嚴經; pinyin: Léngyán Jīng), an especially influential dharani in the Chinese Chan tradition, Vairocana is mentioned to be the host of the Buddha Division in the centre, one of the five major divisions which dispels the vast demon armies of the five directions.

Vairocana is the Primordial Buddha in the Chinese schools of Tiantai, Huayan and Tangmi, also appearing in later schools including the Japanese Kegon, Shingon and esoteric lineages of Tendai. In the case of Huayan and Shingon, Vairocana is the central figure.

In Chinese and Japanese Buddhism, Vairocana was gradually superseded as an object of reverence by Amitābha, due in large part to the increasing popularity of Pure Land Buddhism, but veneration of Vairocana still remains popular among adherents.

During the initial stages of his mission in Japan, the Catholic missionary Francis Xavier was welcomed by the Shingon monks since he used Dainichi, the Japanese name for Vairocana, to designate the Christian God.  As Xavier learned more about the religious nuances of the word, he substituted the term Deusu, which he derived from the Latin and Portuguese Deus.

The Shingon monk Dohan regarded the two great Buddhas, Amitābha and Vairocana, as one and the same Dharmakāya Buddha and as the true nature at the core of all beings and phenomena. There are several realizations that can accrue to the Shingon practitioner of which Dohan speaks in this connection, as James Sanford points out:

Helen Hardacre, writing on the Mahavairocana Tantra, comments that Mahavairocana's virtues are deemed to be immanently universal within all beings: "The principle doctrine of the Dainichikyo is that all the virtues of Dainichi (Mahāvairocana) are inherent in us and in all sentient beings."

Statues
With regard to śūnyatā, the massive size and brilliance of Vairocana statues serve as a reminder that all conditioned existence is empty and without a permanent identity, whereas the Dharmakāya is beyond concepts.

The Spring Temple Buddha of Lushan County, Henan, China, with a height of 126 meters, is the second tallest statue in the world (see list of tallest statues).

The Daibutsu in the Tōdai-ji in Nara, Japan, is the largest bronze image of Vairocana in the world.

The larger of the Buddhas of Bamiyan in Afghanistan that were destroyed was also a depiction of Vairocana.

In Java, Indonesia, the ninth-century Mendut temple near Borobudur in Magelang was dedicated to the Dhyani Buddha Vairocana. Built by the Shailendra dynasty, the temple featured a three-meter tall stone statue of Vairocana, seated and performing the dharmachakra mudrā. The statue is flanked with statues of the bodhisattvas Avalokiteśvara and Vajrapani.

Gallery

See also 
 Mantra of Light

Sources

Bibliography 
Birmingham, Vessantara (2003). Meeting The Buddhas, Windhorse Publications, .
Cook, Francis H. (1977). Hua-Yen Buddhism: The Jewel Net of Indra, Pennsylvania State University Press.
Cook, Francis H. (1972). 'The meaning of Vairocana in Hua-Yen Buddhism, Philosophy East and West 22 (4), 403-415
Park, Kwangsoo (2003). A Comparative Study of the Concept of Dharmakaya Buddha: Vairocana in Hua-yen and Mahavairocana in Shingon Buddhism, International Journal of Buddhist Thought and Culture 2, 305-331

External links

 Sacred Visions: Early Paintings from Central Tibet, an exhibition catalog from The Metropolitan Museum of Art (fully available online as PDF), which contains material on Vairocana (see index)

Buddhas
 
Shingon Buddhism
Vajrayana
Buddhism in China